Rule of nines may refer to:
Rule of nines (mathematics), a test for divisibility by 9 involving summing the decimal digits of a number
 Wallace rule of nines, used to determine the percentage of total body surface area affected when assessing burn injuries

See also
 Rule No. 9